The Silver Treasure is a 1926 American silent action drama film directed by Rowland V. Lee and starring George O'Brien. It is based on the 1904 novel Nostromo by Joseph Conrad. It was produced and distributed by the Fox Film Corporation.

Plot
As described in a film magazine review, Nostromo, a young superintendent of stevedores who is loved by his men and adored by the young women of the town in a South American country, is suddenly enmeshed in love and in a plot to steal a shipment of silver from his friend Charles Gould, a mine owner. He plans to outwit the bandits, and partly succeeds. However, he finds that he is himself tempted to become a thief for the woman he loves, and attempts to steal the silver. Gould gives him a check for a large amount when he returns the silver, and Nostromo confesses his prior temptation to take it. This is forgiven and, following his second defeat of the bandits, he returns to the town to claim his sweetheart Giselle.

Cast

Preservation
With no prints of The Silver Treasure located in any film archives, it is a lost film.

References

External links

1926 films
American silent feature films
Lost American films
Films based on works by Joseph Conrad
Films directed by Rowland V. Lee
Fox Film films
American black-and-white films
American action drama films
1920s action drama films
1926 drama films
1920s American films
Silent American drama films
Silent action drama films